The list of shipwrecks in April 1887 includes ships sunk, foundered, grounded, or otherwise lost during April 1887.

1 April

4 April

5 April

6 April

7 April

8 April

13 April

14 April

15 April

16 April

17 April

18 April

23 April

26 April

27 April

28 April

29 April

Unknown date

References

1887-04
Maritime incidents in April 1887